The 1955 UC Riverside Highlanders football team represented the University of California, Riverside as an independent during the 1955 college football season. The was the school's first season of intercollegiate football. Led by Rod Franz in his first and season as head coach, UC Riverside compiled a record of 1–3–1. The team was outscored by its opponents 127 to 68 for the season. The Highlanders played home games at Wheelock Field in Riverside, California.

Schedule

References

UC Riverside
UC Riverside Highlanders football seasons
UC Riverside Highlanders football